The 1928 San Diego State Aztecs football team represented San Diego State Teachers College during the 1928 NCAA football season.

San Diego State competed in the Southern California Intercollegiate Athletic Conference (SCIAC). The 1928 San Diego State team was led by head coach Charles E. Peterson in his eighth season as football coach of the Aztecs. They played three home games at Balboa Stadium and one at a field on the school campus. The Aztecs finished the season with three wins and three losses (3–3, 2–3 SCIAC). Overall, the team outscored its opponents 111–105 points for the season.

Schedule

Notes

References

San Diego State
San Diego State Aztecs football seasons
San Diego State Aztecs football